Shutter may refer to:

Architecture
Window shutter, a solid window covering used for light control, privacy, security, protection against weather, and to enhance the aesthetics of a building
Roller shutter, a type of door or window shutter mainly used in retail shops, warehouses, and other facilities

Science and technology
Shutter (photography), a photographic device that administers the exposure by limiting the time over which light is admitted
Shutter, a device used to manipulate pulses of light in a signal lamp
Movie projector shutter, used to interrupt the emitted light during the time the film is advanced to the next frame
Remote shutter, in a selfie stick
Stage lighting shutter, used to modify the light cast by a theatre light
Bradbury–Nielsen shutter, a type of electrical ion gate that is used in the field of mass spectrometry

Films
Shutter (2004 film), a horror film from Thailand
Shutter, a 2007 short film starring Sonja Bennett
Shutter (2008 film), an American remake of the 2004 film, starring Joshua Jackson
Shutter (2012 film), an Indian thriller film
Shutter (2014 film), a Marathi-language thriller film

People
Rick Shutter, American drummer and percussionist

See also
 Shuttering (disambiguation)
 Shudder (disambiguation)